Jerome A. Holmes (born November 18, 1961) is an American lawyer serving as the Chief United States circuit judge of the United States Court of Appeals for the Tenth Circuit. He is the first African American to serve on the Tenth Circuit.

Early life and education 

Holmes graduated from Wake Forest University in 1983 with a Bachelor of Arts degree. He then attended the Georgetown University Law Center, where he was an editor of the Georgetown Immigration Law Journal. He graduated with a Juris Doctor in 1988. 

Later in his career, Holmes studied at Harvard University's John F. Kennedy School of Government, receiving a Master of Public Administration in 2000.

Legal career

Holmes began his legal career as a law clerk for judge Wayne Alley of the United States District Court for the Western District of Oklahoma from 1988 to 1990. Holmes then clerked for judge William Judson Holloway, Jr. of the Tenth Circuit from 1990 to 1991. 

After his clerkships, Holmes entered private practice with the law firm Steptoe & Johnson in its Washington, D.C. office. He practiced at the firm as an associate for three years before he returned to Oklahoma to serve as an assistant United States attorney for the Western District of Oklahoma. Holmes served in that capacity from 1994 to 2005. Holmes re-entered private practice in 2005 as a Director of the Oklahoma firm Crowe & Dunlevy, where his practice was focused on white collar criminal defense, complex civil litigation, and corporate law.

Federal judicial service 

Holmes was initially nominated for a federal judgeship in the United States District Court for the Northern District of Oklahoma, having been chosen from group of finalists that included Tulsa attorneys Lane Wilson and John M. O'Connor (Wilson would later serve as U.S. Magistrate Judge for the Northern District before leaving to become General Counsel at the Williams Companies). While his nomination for a United States District Court seat was pending, Holmes was nominated by President George W. Bush on May 4, 2006, to fill a seat vacated by Judge Stephanie Kulp Seymour. Bush's previous pick to replace Judge Seymour, United States District Judge James H. Payne, withdrew over criticism of his handling of cases in which he allegedly had a conflict of interest. The United States Senate confirmed his nomination less than three months later on July 26, 2006, by a 67–30 vote. He received his commission on August 9, 2006.  He became the chief judge on October 1, 2022.

Notable cases
Holmes' first published opinion for the court, United States v. Ahidley, was released on May 25, 2007. Holmes wrote for a unanimous three-judge panel holding that a criminal defendant was improperly ordered to pay immediate restitution to the victim of his crime.  

Holmes was on the first federal appellate court panel to weigh affirmatively on the constitutional right of same-sex couples to marry. He penned an important concurrence on the role of animus in the ban of same-sex marriage in Oklahoma.  

In 2017, Holmes found that the Indian Gaming Regulatory Act did not permit the United States Department of the Interior to force a state to participate in mediation with a tribe after the state had asserted its sovereign immunity.

See also 
 List of African-American federal judges
 List of African-American jurists

References

External links

Blawg Search - Judge Jerome A. Holmes
Opinion May Pose Obstacle for Same-Sex Unions - New York Times - July 28,2014
"Same-sex marriage and animus" by Prof. Dale Carpenter - Washington Post - July 30, 2014
"Holmes' nomination confirmed," Tulsa World, July 27, 2006
Report on Holmes by Alliance for Justice
Jerome Holmes: Another Troubling Nominee - The Leadership Conference - July 13, 2006
Above The Law - Yo Holmes! The Tenth Circuit's Newest Member - July 2006

1961 births
Living people
21st-century American judges
African-American judges
Assistant United States Attorneys
Georgetown University Law Center alumni
Harvard Kennedy School alumni
Judges of the United States Court of Appeals for the Tenth Circuit
United States court of appeals judges appointed by George W. Bush
Wake Forest University alumni